Abena Oppong-Asare (born 8 February 1983) is a British Labour Party politician. She was elected as the Member of Parliament (MP) for Erith and Thamesmead in the 2019 general election. She and Bell Ribeiro-Addy, both elected in the 2019 general election, are the first female British Ghanaian MPs.

She was appointed to the Official Opposition frontbench in 2020, becoming Shadow Exchequer Secretary to the Treasury.

Early life
Oppong-Asare is of Ghanaian descent and studied Politics with International Relations at the University of Kent, where she also attained a master's degree in International Law with International Relations.

Political career 
She is the chair of Labour Women's Network. From 2014 to 2018, she was a Labour Party Councillor for Erith ward on Bexley Council, serving as Deputy Leader of the opposition Labour Group from 2014 to 2016 and acted as the spokesperson on education. She has also previously served as a parliamentary assistant and constituency liaison officer, and has advised the shadow minister for Preventing Violence Against Women and Girls. Prior to her election, Oppong-Asare worked at the Greater London Authority, supporting GLA members to effectively represent the people of London. During this time, she led community engagement following the Grenfell Tower fire.

In 2019, she ran to be the Labour prospective parliamentary candidate in Erith and Thamesmead when the incumbent MP Teresa Pearce announced she would stand down at the next election.

In 2020, she released a report, Leaving Nobody Behind in Erith and Thamesmead, examining the impact of the pandemic on key groups in her constituency, including disabled people, people from an ethnic minority background, women, young people and those from a lower socio-economic background. The report was widely praised upon publication and picked up by local and national media outlets.

On 14 January 2020 she was announced as the Parliamentary Private Secretary to the new Shadow Secretary of State for Environment, Food and Rural Affairs, Luke Pollard.

On 16 April 2020, Oppong-Asare was announced as the Parliamentary Private Secretary to the newly appointed Shadow Chancellor of the Exchequer, Anneliese Dodds.

On 16 October 2020, Oppong-Asare was promoted to Shadow Exchequer Secretary to the Treasury, replacing Wes Streeting, who was moved to the position of Shadow Minister for Schools following resignations the previous day relating to the Covert Human Intelligence Sources (Criminal Conduct) Bill.

In November 2021, the political monitoring organisation Vuelio identified Oppong-Asare as amongst the top six MPs who tabled the most Parliamentary Questions that session and June 2021, PR firm Edelman included her in their list of "ones to watch" from the 2019 intake.

In 2022, Oppong-Asare was included in the Women in Westminster 100 list to mark International Women's Day.

Each year, Oppong-Asare holds a political and campaigning Summer School for local young people in which she invites high-profile speakers to deliver training and workshops designed at encouraging political engagement from those often under-represented.

References

External links 
 
 Abena Oppong-Asare's 2019 election campaign video

Living people
UK MPs 2019–present
21st-century British women politicians
Black British women politicians
Alumni of the University of Kent
English people of Ghanaian descent
Labour Party (UK) councillors
Female members of the Parliament of the United Kingdom for English constituencies
Labour Party (UK) MPs for English constituencies
Councillors in the London Borough of Bexley
1983 births
Black British MPs
Women councillors in England